A rissole (from Latin russeolus, meaning reddish, via French in which "rissoler" means "to redden") is a small  patty enclosed in pastry, or rolled in breadcrumbs, usually baked or deep fried. The filling has savory ingredients, most often minced meat, fish or cheese, and is served as an entrée, main course, or side dish.

In Australia and New Zealand, a rissole is patty of minced meat and other ingredients, without a pastry covering but often covered in a breadcrumb coating, similar to Hamburg steak and Salisbury steak.

Variations

Europe

France

In France, rissoles can be  served as a dessert cooked in the Savoy region. They are made of pears in batter and are baked, not fried.

In the north of France, the rissole de Coucy is made with meat or fish and can be baked or fried. 

Different versions exist in Auvergne or in the east of France, with different kind of meat or potatoes and cheeses.

Great Britain

In Great Britain during and after World War II, rissoles were typically an economy measure, made from cooked meat remaining from the Sunday roast dinner.  They are not pastry-covered. Rissoles are sold in chip shops in south Wales, north-east England, and Yorkshire. Rissoles and chips are a common choice of meal. These rissoles are meat (typically beef), or fish in Yorkshire, mashed up with potato, herbs, and sometimes onion. They are coated in breadcrumbs or less frequently battered and deep-fried.

Ireland
Fried rissoles are common in Ireland, especially in the county of Wexford, where boiled potatoes are mashed, mixed with herbs and spices, battered or breadcrumbed, and served with chips, chicken or battered sausages.

Poland
In Poland, rissoles are known as sznycle (singular "sznycel") and are very common in canteens, especially in schools. Eaten hot as the main part of the main course, sznycle are usually served with boiled potatoes (sometimes mashed) and vegetables. The stuffing is always minced meat. Other variations use chicken or a combination of cheese and ham as a filling. In some regions where the name denotes a Wiener Schnitzel, the term kotlet siekany (literally: "chopped cutlet") is used instead.

Portugal

In Portugal, rissoles are known as rissóis (singular "rissol") and are a very popular snack that can be found in many cafes, barbecues, house parties, receptions, birthday and baptism parties. Rissóis are a breaded pastry shaped as half-moon, usually filled with meat or shrimp in béchamel sauce and then deep fried. The most common fillings are shrimp or meat (from pork, including piglet meat, or beef), although hake, tuna, octopus, vegetables, cod, duck, cockle and spinach are sometimes used too. Other and less common variations use chicken or a combination of cheese, normally slices of queijo Flamengo (Flemish cheese) and cubes or slices of pork ham as a filling. Sometimes lobster is also used.
Rissóis are usually eaten cold, as a snack or as an appetizer, but can also be a main course, usually served with salad or rice, the rice could be peas rice, tomato rice, carrot rice, beans rice or greens rice.

South America
In Brazil, they are often filled with heart of palm, cheese, ham, ground meat,  chicken or shrimp. The term may refer to an Empanada, or Papa rellena which means 'filled'.

Australia and New Zealand

This form of rissole is very similar to a hamburger patty and is made from minced meat without a pastry covering, resembling an irregular meatball, often covered in a crumb coating similar to that on a schnitzel. An Australian and New Zealand rissole usually contains more ingredients than a hamburger, almost always using breadcrumbs but many Australians and New Zealanders have their own family recipe which may also include onion, finely grated herbs and vegetables, sauces, salt, and spices. 

Rissoles are usually made from beef, chicken or lamb. Basing the rissoles on ingredients such as tuna, and pumpkin is also possible. They are cooked in a pan or on a barbecue, and are usually eaten hot as part of a meal. Australian rissoles are not usually eaten hot between bread with salad or cheese. If they are they will usually be called hamburger patties (despite differences between the two types of patty); however, cold rissoles are frequently eaten as a sandwich filling later.

The Australian rissole became popular during both World Wars as a means of stretching meat rationing set by the Australian government. Rissoles were made by butchers and housewives to use offcuts of meat, then finely minced with the adding of leftover bread crumbs, abundant flour, eggs, vegetables and herbs to improve the flavour. The Australian rissole has evolved over the past 100 years with some Australian families having special recipes and secret ingredients including beer, Vegemite, peanut butter, cornflakes, carrot, chilli and spices.

Indonesia

Rissole is a snack food in Indonesia, where they are called risoles (pronounced 'riss-ol-less') or just risol. The skin is made from batter in the same fashion as flat crepes. They are commonly filled with bechamel, chicken, egg, and diced vegetables - including carrot, celery, common beans and potato. The filling is wrapped inside the skin, then the package is rolled upon breadcrumbs and fried in ample amounts of hot cooking oil. It is eaten with bird's eye chili, chilli sauce, tomato sauce, mayonnaise or mustard.

See also

Croquette
Empanada
Faggot
Frikadeller
Jamaican patty
Kjøttkake
Kofta

References

External links

Dumplings
Appetizers
Deep fried foods
British cuisine
Irish cuisine
French cuisine
Portuguese cuisine
Polish cuisine
Australian cuisine
New Zealand cuisine
Brazilian cuisine
Indonesian cuisine